The 1975–76 Liga Leumit season saw Hapoel Be'er Sheva win their second consecutive title. It was the only season to date in which the league had 18 clubs.

Four clubs, Hapoel Petah Tikva, Hapoel Hadera, Bnei Yehuda and Maccabi Ramat Amidar (in their first season in the top division) were relegated as the league was reduced to 16 clubs the following season.

Oded Machnes of Maccabi Netanya was the league's top scorer of 21 goals.

Final table

Results

References
Israel - List of final tables RSSSF

Liga Leumit seasons
Israel
1975–76 in Israeli football leagues